Sartipabad may refer to:
 Sartipabad, Kermanshah
 Sartipabad, Kohgiluyeh and Boyer-Ahmad
 Sartipabad, Kurdistan